José Manuel Menéndez Erimia (born 7 January 1971 in Avilés, Asturias), commonly known as Manel, is a Spanish retired professional footballer who played as a midfielder.

Honours
Avilés
Segunda División B: 1989–90

Deportivo
La Liga: 1999–2000

Eibar
Segunda División B: 2006–07

References

External links

1971 births
Living people
People from Avilés
Spanish footballers
Footballers from Asturias
Association football midfielders
La Liga players
Segunda División players
Segunda División B players
Real Avilés CF footballers
Real Oviedo Vetusta players
Real Oviedo players
Deportivo de La Coruña players
CD Numancia players
CD Tenerife players
Ciudad de Murcia footballers
SD Eibar footballers
Spanish football managers
Segunda División B managers
Tercera División managers
Segunda Federación managers